Rezo Dzhikiya (born 1 September 1980) is a former Russian footballer of Georgian descent.

Club career
He made his Russian Football National League debut for FC Zvezda Irkutsk on 8 June 1996 in a game against FC Okean Nakhodka. He later played 1 more season in the FNL for FC Anzhi Makhachkala.

He spent 10 out of last 11 seasons of his career in Georgia.

Honours
 Russian Second Division He was the top scorer for Zone East in 2003 with 13 goals.

References

External links
 

1980 births
Sportspeople from Irkutsk
Russian people of Georgian descent
Living people
Russian footballers
Association football forwards
FC Zvezda Irkutsk players
FC Torpedo Kutaisi players
FC Borjomi players
FC Dinamo Batumi players
FC Metalurgi Rustavi players
FC Anzhi Makhachkala players
FC Zugdidi players
FC Kolkheti-1913 Poti players
FC Sioni Bolnisi players
FC Spartaki Tskhinvali players
FC Dila Gori players
FC Sasco players
Erovnuli Liga players
FC Chita players